Ex-Bad Boy is a 1931 American comedy film directed by Vin Moore and written by Fred Niblo, Jr. and Dale Van Every. The film stars Robert Armstrong, Jean Arthur, Jason Robards, Sr., Spencer Charters, Grayce Hampton and Lola Lane. The film was released on July 15, 1931, by Universal Pictures.

Cast 
Robert Armstrong as Chester Binney
Jean Arthur as Ethel Simmons
Jason Robards, Sr. as Roger Shields
Spencer Charters as Henry Simmons
Grayce Hampton as Mrs. Simmons
Lola Lane as Letta Lardo
George Brent as Donald Swift
Mary Doran as Sadie Bloom

See also
 The Whole Town's Talking (1926)
 A Rumor of Love (1960)

References

External links 
 

1931 films
American comedy films
1931 comedy films
Universal Pictures films
Films directed by Vin Moore
American black-and-white films
Remakes of American films
Sound film remakes of silent films
1930s English-language films
1930s American films